Chas. H. Hansen Music Corp. was an American music publisher founded by Charles Henry Hansen (1913–1995) in 1952 and incorporated in New York.  Its music covered a broad spectrum of genres that included classical (opera, orchestra, band, choral, chamber, and solo), jazz, folk, rock, country, popular, educational — and music text books.  For Beatles fans, the firm was widely known for having been the sole U.S. publisher and distributor of Beatles sheet music, beginning 1964.  By the 1980s, Hansen Music ventured away from the pop field, focusing on classics and jazz method books.  The firm, in 1980, was also operating 7 retail sheet music stores — two in San Francisco, three in Seattle, and two in Las Vegas.   The name — Charles Hansen Music & Books, Inc. — became inactive in 1991.  Hansen House Music Publishers — a Florida registered fictitious name of Hansen Publications, Inc. — became inactive December 31, 2009. The Hansen House web page is now (July 2018) inactive, listed as being "parked" by the GoDaddy domain registrar. The internet archive at https://web.archive.org has their latest snapshot of this website being active as in September 2013; contact person listed on earlier versions was Ramon Duran.  The larger part of the Charles Hansen catalog was acquired by Warner Brothers Publications, then subsequently sold to Alfred Publications.  According to Billboard in 1972, Wometco, headed by Mitchell Wolfson, had a pending offer to acquire Hansen, retaining Hansen and his staff.

History highlights

Initial incorporation

The firm — incorporated on December 11, 1952, by Charles Henry Hansen — was the outgrowth of an earlier proprietorship founded by Hansen in 1946 named the Charles Hansen Music Company. Hansen was the sole owner of both firms and was also the owner of Ethel Smith Music Corp., a New York corporation founded in 1949 and dissolved in 1991.  Hansen formed several partnerships with artists and other publishers, mostly for the purpose of distributing folios of hits. Some titles now seem so rare or hard to find that no amount of searching will suggest they ever existed. One such title is Pacific Popular no.60: 'The Big 12 string Guitar' which held transcriptions from most of the tracks on LPs (now a CD) titled 'The 12 string story'.

Folio reprint business

By 1950, Hansen Music had become an influential music folio reprinter of hit music of other publishers — a growing niche market that had erstwhile been led by larger firms.  The Hansen folios included simplified scoring of popular music for elementary piano, uke, trumpet, clarinet, saxophone, accordion, trombone, Western quartets, sacred choir, and barbershop quartets.

The publishing of sheet music, single and folio, had become a near monopoly by a few large companies.  The youngest, founded in 1971 by a longtime protégé of Charles Hansen, Frank Hackinson, was Screen Gems—Columbia Publications.  The others were Charles Hansen Publications, Warner Brothers Music, and the oldest, Big Three Music, owned by United Artists.  Working out of fully equipped and self-contained facilities in Florida, with staffs and arrangers, Screen Gems and Hansen accounted for about two-thirds of the industry's $140 million annual retail gross sales.  A fundamental difference between Screen Gems and Hansen was that Screen–Gems mostly owned the copyrights to the music of its folios, whereas Hansen mostly licensed the copyrights.

Early on, in 1954, Hansen Music acquired the Caribbean Music Catalog from publisher Joe Davis (1896–1978), containing 500 tunes, of which, 150 were published.  However, it is unclear whether the deal was done as an acquisition or a license.

On May 20, 1971, the firm changed its name to Charles Hansen Music & Books, Inc. The firm became inactive December 24, 1991.

Legitimate fake books

Hansen Music was the first to delve deeply into published legal fake books that had enough songs for serious musicians. Fake books published:

 1001 Jumbo Song Book (1972);  
  Revised (1977); 
 1003 Greatest Song Book: The Star Performer Song Book of Show Tunes & Movie Themes (1977); 
 The 666 Popular fake song book (Books 1 & 2) (1967); 
 Real Fake Book:  For All Popular Instruments: 202 Popular Songs, Combo Style (1966); 

By the late 1970s, the publishing of legal fake books by Hansen Music and others achieved through competition assimilation what the copyright laws miserably failed to do through prohibition.  In the vernacular of jazz musicians, “legit” often means “classical.”  But in the vernacular of this topic, “legit” and “real” means “legal.”

Divisions & locations
At one time, the corporation had offices in Chicago, St. Louis, Seattle, Los Angeles, Dallas, and New York City, but none remained open as long as the headquarters in New York, located on the 6th floor of a building at 119 West 57th Street, New York City, two doors west of Steinway Hall and on the same block, across the street and east of Carnegie Hall. When the Hansen corporation began to grow, it needed more warehouse space, and later moved to the first floor of the same building. This was the main headquarters until 1958, when it moved to Miami Beach, Florida. The 57th Street building, still standing, is a 16-story structure designed by Emery Roth and completed in 1927.

 Hansen Distributing Corporation, a New York corporation formed September 4, 1951
 Hansen Publications, Inc.,        new name as of 1 February 1952                 – administrative dissolution 25 September 2009 (Florida)
 Inter-Company Publications, Inc., new name as of 27 February 1981                – rendered inactive 16 September 2005 (Florida)
1949–1953: Walter Beeler, wind ensemble composer, served as executive editor and staff composer 
1953–1966: Alfred Reed, wind ensemble composer, served as executive editor and staff composer

 Hanlit Publications, Inc., a New York corporation formed January 5, 1966

 On January 5, 1966, Hansen became partners with composer and music executive Ervin Litkei (1921–2000), forming "Hanlit Publications, Inc.," which became well known for having been the sole U.S. publisher and distributor of Beatles sheet music, beginning 1966.

 Charles Hansen Educational Music and Books, Inc. ("and" spelled out vs. "&")
 Charles Hansen Productions, Inc.
 Music Retailers Service, Inc.
 Hansen House
 1820 West Avenue
 Miami Beach, Florida

Notable staff members 
 Composers
 Walter Beeler (1909–1973), director of bands and professor of professor at Ithaca College, had been a staff editor of concert band music for Hansen Music until 1956.  On his recommendation, Hansen hired Alfred Reed in January 1953 as staff composer.
 Alfred Reed, composer
 John Edmondson, composer, education editor from 1970 to 1979
 Sales
 Lionel Job (born 1942), sales
 Frank Hackinson (né Francis J. Hackinson; born 1927), also a composer, worked for Hansen Publications from 1954 to 1971

Charles Hansen 
In 1941, Hansen was the sales manager of Mercer & Morris (Edwin H. Morris).  When Mercer & Morris acquired White-Smith Music Publishing Company in 1941, Hansen assumed the same role at White-Smith. In the 1930s, Hansen was a traveling song-plugger for Mills Music.

Family 
Charles Hansen was married to Isabel McGehee Hood (1914–2003).  They had a son, Charles H. Hansen, Jr. (born 1954), and two daughters, Susan Marie Isabel Hansen and Kathleen Florence Hansen (1949–2009).  Susan is married to Michael Stanton Jeffries, the former CEO of Abercrombie & Fitch Co.

In 1951 Hansen purchased the home of John Reed King at 4 North Drive, Malba, Queens.

References 

Publishing companies established in 1952
Music publishing companies of the United States
Publishing companies of the United States
Defunct companies based in New York City